Matthew Rowell (born 1 July 2001) is a professional Australian rules footballer playing for the Gold Coast Suns in the Australian Football League (AFL). Rowell was recruited by Gold Coast with the first selection in the 2019 AFL draft. He was nominated for the 2020 AFL Rising Star award in round 2 of the 2020 season.

Early life 
Rowell was born in Sydney, New South Wales to a mother from Victoria and a father from Queensland. The family moved to Melbourne when Rowell was a child and he began playing football when his father took him to Mont Albert to participate in Auskick. He played majority of his junior football with the Canterbury Cobras and was touted as a future AFL player as early as the under 10 level. As Rowell progressed through the junior ranks, he was given an opportunity to debut in the TAC Cup for the Oakleigh Chargers a month after his 16th birthday.  Leading into the 2019 season, Rowell was considered the early favourite to be selected with the number 1 pick in the 2019 AFL draft. He showed his worth by dominating for Victoria Metro at the AFL Under 18 National Championships and playing a pivotal role in Oakleigh's NAB League premiership season, including a Grand Final performance against the Eastern Ranges in which he recorded 44 disposals and two goals. He was subsequently voted best on ground in the NAB League Grand Final and awarded U18 All-Australian selection. Rowell attended Carey Grammar with future Gold Coast teammate Noah Anderson throughout his teenage years. The pair were instrumental in delivering Carey's second ever football APS Premiership in 2019 and raising the profile of the school's football program.

AFL career

2020

Rowell made his AFL debut against Port Adelaide at Metricon Stadium in round 1 of the 2020 AFL season. It was reported before round 2, on 10 June 2020 that he signed a two-year contract extension to remain with the Suns until the end of 2023. The following match, in just his second ever AFL game, Rowell was voted best on ground against one of the then-Premiership favourite teams, the West Coast Eagles, and was awarded the round 2 AFL Rising Star nomination for his 26-disposal, two-goal performance. In round 3, Rowell produced another 20 disposals and two goals in Gold Coast's 53-point win over the Adelaide Crows in another best on ground performance. Round 4 saw Rowell collect another 20 disposals and kick two goals against the Fremantle Dockers, in another best on ground performance.

In the Suns' round 5 loss to Geelong, Rowell suffered a dislocated shoulder in the first quarter during a heavy tackle from Brandan Parfitt and took no further part in the game. Rowell opted for surgery in order to repair his shoulder, a choice which caused him to be sidelined for three months. The injury was likened to Gary Ablett Jr.'s 2014 injury of the same nature, and was deemed 'eerily similar' as almost six years to the day, Ablett also suffered a season-ending shoulder injury (to Brent Macaffer) during a tackle whilst playing for Gold Coast. Both Rowell and Ablett were tackled by players wearing the number 3. Ablett offered to be Rowell's mentor during his recovery as Ablett had experience with injury himself. 

Rowell’s performance in the early rounds of the year was widely considered extremely impressive, with commenters deeming him among the greatest first-year players. Rowell was considered by Gavin Wanganeen at the time to be a potential contender for the Brownlow Medal.

2021 
Rowell returned from injury in round 1 of the 2021 AFL season, playing against the West Coast Eagles at Perth Stadium, on Sunday 21 March 2021. Early in the first term, Rowell was forcefully tackled by Zac Langdon, landing heavily on his left knee. He limped to the bench and was assessed in the medical rooms, following which he was substituted out of the game and replaced by Nick Holman. He later emerged with a knee brace.

Coach Stewart Dew provided an update before the start of the third quarter:It’s not ‘serious’ serious, but it’s serious enough that it’ll keep him out, from what we can tell right now, for a few weeks ... But we don’t think it’s anything too major. On 23 March 2021, it was reported that scans had confirmed "a partial tear of his posterior cruciate ligament" and would be unable to play for 10 to 12 weeks.

On 20 April 2021, it was reported that Rowell was on track for a mid-season return in round 14 against the Port Adelaide Power at Carrara Stadium.

On 10 June 2021, it was reported that Rowell would be selected to play against Fremantle in round 13. "He's ready, he's absolutely ready", Coach Dew said. "Physically his body is better prepared than what it was leading into round one." "We're just excited he can play a game of footy again and the most excited person is Rowelly himself, which is great to see, it just shows what footy means to him and it's good to see that spring in his step again."

Rowell played out the rest of the season, however played injured and looked "noticeably out of sorts", averaging just 14.1 disposals in the 2021 season, well below his output before his 2020 injury.

2022 
Following a "solid off-season", Rowell returned in round one and produced a career best performance with 33 disposals (17 kicks and 16 handballs), 22 contested possessions, 10 score involvements, nine clearances and six tackles, in a 27 point win over the West Coast Eagles.

Statistics
Updated to the end of round 1, 2023.

|-
| 2020 ||  || 18
| 5 || 6 || 0 || 38 || 49 || 87 || 4 || 26 || 1.2 || 0.0 || 7.6 || 9.8 || 17.4 || 0.8 || 5.2 || 9
|-
| 2021 ||  || 18
| 12 || 2 || 0 || 66 || 103 || 169 || 22 || 49 || 0.2 || 0.0 || 5.5 || 8.6 || 14.1 || 1.8 || 4.1 || 0
|-
| 2022 ||  || 18
| 22 || 2 || 4 || 214 || 194 || 408 || 27 || 158 || 0.1 || 0.2 || 9.7 || 8.8 || 18.5 || 1.2 || 7.2 || 4
|-
| 2023 ||  || 18
| 1 || 0 || 0 || 17 || 11 || 28 || 2 || 8 || 0.0 || 0.0 || 17.0 || 11.0 || 28.0 || 2.0 || 8.0 || 
|- class=sortbottom
! colspan=3 | Career
! 40 !! 10 !! 4 !! 335 !! 357 !! 692 !! 55 !! 242 !! 0.3 !! 0.1 !! 8.4 !! 8.9 !! 17.3 !! 1.4 !! 6.1 !! 13
|}

Notes

Honours and achievements
 AFL Rising Star nominee: 2020

References

External links
 
 
 

Living people
2001 births
Gold Coast Football Club players
Oakleigh Chargers players
Australian rules footballers from Melbourne
People educated at Carey Baptist Grammar School